Electro–optics is a branch of electrical engineering, electronic engineering, materials science, and material physics involving components, electronic devices such as lasers, laser diodes, LEDs, waveguides, etc. which operate by the propagation and interaction of light with various tailored materials. It is closely related to the branch of optics, involving application of generation of photons, called photonics. It is not only concerned with the "electro–optic effect", since it deals with the interaction between the electromagnetic (optical) and the electrical (electronic) states of materials.

Electro-optical devices 
The electro-optic effect is a change in the optical properties of an optically active material due to interaction with light. This interaction usually results in a change in the birefringence, and not simply the refractive index of the medium. In a Kerr cell, the change in birefringence is proportional to the square of the optical electric field, and the material is usually a liquid.  In a Pockels cell, the  change in birefringence varies linearly with the electric field, and the material is usually a crystal. Non-crystalline, solid electro-optical materials have generated interest because of their low cost of production. These organic, polymer-based materials are also known as organic EO material, plastic EO material, or polymer EO material. They consist of nonlinear optical chromophores in a polymer lattice. The nonlinear optical chromophores can produce Pockels effect.

References

External links
 Introduction to Electro-Optical Systems in Unmanned Vehicle Applications - Unmanned Systems Technology

Atomic, molecular, and optical physics
Optoelectronics
Nonlinear optics